There are multiple prehistoric petroglyphs (rock markings) in the area of Bishop, California (Inyo County, near Mono County) that may be called the Bishop Petroglyphs.

 Yellow Jacket Petroglyphs
 Chalfant Petroglyph Site
 Big and Little Petroglyph Canyons
 Coso Rock Art District

References

Petroglyphs in California